Decane is an alkane hydrocarbon with the chemical formula C10H22.  Although 75 structural isomers are possible for decane, the term usually refers to the normal-decane ("n-decane"), with the formula CH3(CH2)8CH3.  All isomers, however, exhibit similar properties and little attention is paid to the composition. These isomers  are flammable liquids. Decane is present in small quantities (less than 1%) in gasoline (petrol) and kerosene.  Like other alkanes, it is a nonpolar solvent, and does not dissolve in water, and is readily combustible.  Although it is a component of fuels, it is of little importance as a chemical feedstock, unlike a handful of other alkanes.

Reactions
Decane undergoes combustion, just like other alkanes. In the presence of sufficient oxygen, it burns to form water and carbon dioxide.

2 C10H22  +  31 O2  →  20 CO2  +  22 H2O
With insufficient oxygen, carbon monoxide is also formed.

Other
It has a surface tension of 0.0238 N·m−1.

See also
 Higher alkanes
 List of isomers of decane

References

External links
 
 Material Safety Data Sheet for Decane 
 CHEMINFO Decane 

Alkanes